Four Days is a 1951 British drama film directed by John Guillermin. It was based on a play of the same name by Monckton Hoffe.

Plot 
Businessman Francis Templar (Hugh McDermott) suspects his neglected wife Lucienne (Kathleen Byron) of having an affair with his business partner's son Johnny (Peter Reynolds). When the two of them confess, Templar refuses to give his wife a divorce and she retaliates by trying to poison him. Johnny however, intervenes, and manages to prevent the murder. During the next few days, Lucienne comes to realise she loves her husband after all; but Templar, believing his wife is about to leave him, attempts suicide by jumping off a cliff. He survives the fall, but loses all memory of the previous four days. Now an amnesiac, Templar is blissfully in love with his devoted wife. However, she fears their happiness is only temporary, and dreads the return of her husband's memory. To make matters worse, Johnny then reappears to blackmail Lucienne, threatening to reveal all to her husband.

Cast

Production
The film was based on a play by Mockton Hoffe which debuted in 1945.

Critical reception 
TV Guide gave the film two out of five stars, noting "A ludicrous melodrama which manages to pull off a couple of gripping scenes."

The MFB complained about "indifferent construction."

Filmink said "It’s short, taut and lots of fun; Guillermin’s direction is energetic, and there are excellent performances from Kathleen Byron and Reynolds."

References

External links 

Four Days at Reel Streets

Films directed by John Guillermin
1951 films
Films based on works by Monckton Hoffe
British drama films
1951 drama films
British black-and-white films
1950s English-language films
1950s British films